Verena Keller (born in 1942) is a German operatic mezzosoprano.

Life 
Keller, born in Schwerin daughter of the Swiss opera singer Jakob Keller (1911-1992), studied at the Universität für Musik und darstellende Kunst Wien and is a lecturer at the Hochschule für Musik und Darstellende Kunst Frankfurt am Main and the Peter Cornelius Conservatory. Among others, she played in the Grand Théâtre de Genève, the Deutsche Oper Berlin, the Hamburg State Opera, the Opernhaus Düsseldorf, at the Opera de Paris, the Teatro Massimo of Palermo, the Teatro San Carlo of Naples and at the Vancouver Opera auf.

Her opera studio took place in Stadtcasino Basel in 2015.

Repertoire 
 Wozzeck – Marie
 Il trovatore – Azucena
 Tristan und Isolde – Brangäne
 Jenůfa – Küsterin
 Don Carlos – Eboli
 Un ballo in maschera – Ulrica
 Lohengrin – Ortrud
 Katja Kabanowa – Kabanicha

Publications 
 Concerto no. 5 pour piano et orchestre. Ludwig van Beethoven. Berlin, Pool-Musikproduktion, 1998.
 Lirica & l’intimiste. Xavier Delisle. Munich, Koka Media, 1998.
 Messe D-dur op. 86. Antonín Dvořák. Stuttgart, Carus-Verlag, 1987.
 Messe in D-dur Opus 86 für Soli, Chor und Orgel. Antonín Dvořák. Stuttgart, Carus-Verlag, 1976.

Further reading 
 Großes Sängerlexikon. Saur, Bern/München 1997, 3rd edition.

References

External links 

 Verena Keller on Operissimo
 
 

German operatic mezzo-sopranos
1942 births
Living people
People from Schwerin